Masashi Onda (born 27 June 1939) is a Japanese field hockey player. He competed in the men's tournament at the 1968 Summer Olympics.

References

External links
 

1939 births
Living people
Japanese male field hockey players
Olympic field hockey players of Japan
Field hockey players at the 1968 Summer Olympics
Sportspeople from Okinawa Prefecture
20th-century Japanese people